The Bocq is a river in Belgium, a right-bank tributary of the Meuse. The full length of the Bocq lies in the province of Namur.

Geography 

On its way it passes through the villages of Mohiville, Achet, Hamois, Emptinne, Sovet, Braibant and Spontin. From this village, the valley gets woodier. In Bauche, it receives the waters of its main tributary, the Crupet.

Communes crossed by the Bocq 

 Hamois (from Scy to Emptinne and near Natoye).
 Ciney (near Braibant).
 Yvoir (from Spontin to the center of Yvoir where it flows into the Meuse).

Tributaries 

 The Crupet (right bank)
 The Leignon (left bank)
 The Petit Bocq (right bank)
 The Potriat (left bank)

Economy 

 2 stone quarries are still in use between Spontin and Yvoir. There were several dozen of them, which is why the railway line was built.
 On the banks of its lower part, the Bocq had several mills used to grind grain or, in the hamlet of Chansin, to generate the electricity needed to crush limestone.
It supplies about 15% of the Brussels drinking water distribution network.
 In Spontin, the water of three sources had been collected by the Spadel company since 1922 and bottled on site. It was also used for lemonade production. In August 2011 Mecca Cola developed a plan to exploit the Spontin sources, but abandoned it in 2012.
 The Bocq gave its name to the Brasserie du Bocq in Purnode. 
 Railway line 128 follows the Bocq from Braibant to Yvoir and is operated as a tourist line by the Chemin de fer du Bocq.

Flow 
Measurements during the same period show:

See also 

 List of rivers of Belgium

References 

Ciney
Yvoir
Rivers of Namur (province)